Cupuladria elegans is a species of bryozoans in the suborder Flustrina. It is a Holocene species from the Nansha Islands sea area.

References

External links 

 
 Cupuladria elegans at the World Register of Marine Species (WoRMS)

Cheilostomatida
Invertebrates of China
Marine fauna of Asia
Holocene first appearances
Animals described in 1991